In enzymology, a phenol O-methyltransferase is an enzyme that catalyzes the chemical reaction

S-adenosyl-L-methionine + phenol  S-adenosyl-L-homocysteine + anisole

Thus, the two substrates of this enzyme are S-adenosyl methionine and phenol, whereas its two products are S-adenosylhomocysteine and anisole.

This enzyme belongs to the family of transferases, specifically those transferring one-carbon group methyltransferases.  The systematic name of this enzyme class is S-adenosyl-L-methionine:phenol O-methyltransferase. This enzyme is also called PMT.  This enzyme participates in tyrosine metabolism.

References 

 

EC 2.1.1
Enzymes of unknown structure
O-methylated natural phenols metabolism